King's Academy Prospect is a coeducational secondary school and sixth form located in West Reading, Berkshire, England.

History 
Stoneham Secondary School for Boys opened in April 1956 and Westwood Girls School opened in April 1958. Prospect School was formed in 1985 by combining Stoneham Boys School and Westwood Girls School. To this day the school has two entrances because the combined Stoneham and Westwood buildings were originally built close to each other and each had its own entrance.

Prospect School became an academy on 1 July 2011 and is now sponsored by the King's Group Academies. The school was later renamed King's Academy Prospect to reflect this.

Admissions
The school caters for those in Key Stage 3 and Key Stage 4 and Sixth Form Key Stage 5, between the ages of 11 and 18. The school follows the National Curriculum. The school currently has 1,023 students.

Buildings
King's Academy Prospect is situated on a 34-acre green site on the western outskirts of Reading. A capital investment of £5.6 million resulted in refurbished Science and Art facilities, a modern Learning Center as a base for the Sixth Form and a new Technology block that houses media studios and the Motor Vehicle and Construction department. The school has a total of 7 Blocks consisting of:

 A block = Geography, History, R.E., Music, Art and Drama
 B block = Science and Technology 
 C block = Science, ICT and Technology
 D block = English, Mathematics, Sociology and Psychology
 Sports Hall = (E Block) P.E.   
 Sixth Form Centre = (F block)   Business, Health & Social Care and Modern Foreign Languages
 Loddon Building = (G block)  Hair and Beauty, Technology, Construction and Media Studies

Curriculum
The school teaches: English Language, English Literature, Mathematics, Science, French, German, History, Geography, Religious Studies, Art, Business Studies, Health and Social Care, Computing, ICT, Music, Drama, Dance, Physical Education, Technology (including Food, Graphics, Resistant Material and Textile Technology), Sociology,  PSHE, Accountancy and Law.

The school offers a range of subjects for GCSE – most of the above and many more including Motor Vehicle Maintenance, Construction, Hairdressing and Media Studies.

References

External links

 
 EduBase
 
 

Secondary schools in Reading, Berkshire
Academies in Reading, Berkshire